Sufia Ahmed (20 November 1932 – 9 April 2020) was a Bangladeshi academician. She was selected as the first female National Professor of Bangladesh in January 1995. She was awarded Ekushey Padak in 2002 by the Government of Bangladesh.

Career
Ahmed was born in the Faridpur District to M Ibrahim, a justice and former vice-chancellor of the University of Dhaka and Lutfunnessa Ibrahim. She was a student of Brojomohun College in Barisal. In 1950, she got admitted to the University of Dhaka (DU). She was one of the female forerunners to break section 144 and deny the curfew in DU Campus on February 21, 1952. She earned her Ph.D. degree in 1960 in London.

Ahmed joined as a faculty member at the Department of Islamic History and Culture of the University of Dhaka in 1961. She was a visiting professor of Bosphorus University in Istanbul and Alverno College in Milwaukee, Wisconsin.

Ahmed served as a member of board of the directors of Bangladesh Bank. She was the president of Bangladesh Itihas Parishad.

Personal life
Ahmed married Barrister Syed Ishtiaq Ahmed in June 1955. Together they had a son, Syed Refaat Ahmed, a judge of the Bangladesh Supreme Court and a daughter, Raina Ahmed, a physician.

On July 18, 2004, Sufia Ahmed established a trust fund titled "Barrister Syed Ishtiaq Ahmed Memorial Foundation" at the Asiatic Society of Bangladesh.

Justice Syed Refaat Ahmed and Tasneem Raina Fateh, the two worthy children of Sufia Ahmed, established a trust fund titled "National Professor Dr. Sufia Ahmed Memorial Foundation" on November 20, 2020 at the Asiatic Society of Bangladesh.

Awards
 Sufia Kamal Award (2015) 
 Ekushey Padak (2002)

References

1932 births
2020 deaths
People from Faridpur District
University of Dhaka alumni
Academic staff of the University of Dhaka
Bangladeshi women academics
National Professors of Bangladesh
Recipients of the Ekushey Padak